The Minister of Internal Affairs is a ministerial portfolio in the government of New Zealand with responsibility over the Department of Internal Affairs. The position of Minister of Internal Affairs has existed since the Department of Internal Affairs replaced the Colonial Secretary's office from 19 November 1907. The responsibilities of the office have been progressively reduced as other ministerial roles have been spun-off from the Department of Internal Affairs. Today his or her remit includes internal security and administering applications for citizenship.

List of Ministers
The following ministers held the office of Minister of Internal Affairs.

Key

Notes

References

Internal Affairs
New Zealand